Anping Bridge is a Song dynasty stone beam bridge in Fujian province. The bridge is also known as the Wuli Bridge (literally Five Li Bridge) because its length is about 5 li, where a li is about 500 meters or 0.3 miles. It is a nationally protected historic site registered with the National Cultural Heritage Administration.

The bridge lies in the prefecture-level city of Quanzhou, crossing what originally was a tidal estuary of the Shijing River that separates the town of Anhai (in the county-level city of Jinjiang) east of the river, from the town of Shuitou (in the county-level city of Nan'an) west of the river. The bridge is named after Anhai, which was formerly known as Anping.

Anping Bridge consists of 331 spans of granite beams resting on top of stone piers, the largest beam weighing 25 tons. It originally had five pavilions where travelers could rest; however, only one pavilion (Shuixin Pavilion) still exists.

In 2021, Anping Bridge was inscribed on the UNESCO World Heritage List along with other Song dynasty sites around Quanzhou because of its importance to medieval maritime trade in China and the exchange of cultures and ideas around the world.

History
Construction of the bridge started in 1138 during the Southern Song dynasty and lasted until 1151. It was originally 811 zhang [] long and 1.6 zhang [] wide, with 362 spans. Upon completion, it was the longest bridge in China until 1905, inspiring the local description, "No bridge in the world is as long as this one". There have been six major repairs since its opening, and the bridge is now shorter due to silting of the estuary. During the Song and Yuan periods (10th to 14th centuries), this bridge connected sites of ceramic and iron production in the hinterland to Quanzhou, where the items would be sold around the world.

Current conditions
The estuary of the Shijing River has mostly silted up in this area, and the remaining river channel under the bridge is fairly narrow. Consequently, the bridge now mostly crosses what amounts to a sequence of lakes or ponds, separated by wetlands. A modern public highway crosses the Shijing River a few hundred meters south (downstream) of the historical Anping Bridge over a fairly short bridge. The areas around the bridge are being developed into parks.

See also
 List of bridges in China

Notes

References
 
 
 
 

Buildings and structures completed in 1151
Bridges in Fujian
History of Fujian
Song dynasty architecture
Stone bridges in China
Bridges completed in the 12th century
Major National Historical and Cultural Sites in Fujian